Novotroitsk is a town in Orenburg Oblast, Russia.

Novotroitsk may also refer to:

Places in Russia
Novotroitsk, Karmaskalinsky District, Republic of Bashkortostan, a rural locality in Bashkortostan
Novotroitsk, Rodinsky District, Altai Krai, a rural locality in Altai Krai
Novotroitsk, Sharansky District, Republic of Bashkortostan, a rural locality in Bashkortostan
Novotroitsk, Talmensky District, Altai Krai, a rural locality in Altai Krai
Novotroitsk, Yanaulsky District, Republic of Bashkortostan, a rural locality in Bashkortostan
Novo-Troitsk, a rural locality in Altai Krai

Other
FC Nosta Novotroitsk, a Russian football club
FC Tavriya Novotroitsk, a Ukrainian football club

See also
Novotroitsky